Public Libraries Act is a stock short title used in the United Kingdom for legislation ("Acts of Parliament") relating to public libraries.

List

 The Public Libraries Act 1850 (13 & 14 Vict c 65)
 The Public Libraries (Ireland) Act 1855 (18 & 19 Vict c 40)
 The Public Libraries Amendment Act 1877 (40 & 41 Vict c 54)
 The Public Libraries (Ireland) Amendment Act 1877 (40 & 41 Vict c 15)
 The Public Libraries Act 1884 (47 & 48 Vict c 37)
 The Public Libraries Consolidation (Scotland) Act 1887 (50 & 51 Vict c 42)
 The Public Libraries Act 1892 (55 & 56 Vict c 53)
 The Public Libraries Amendment Act 1893 (56 Vict c 11)
 The Public Libraries (Scotland) Act 1894 (57 & 58 Vict c 20)
 The Public Libraries (Ireland) Act 1894 (57 & 58 Vict c 38)
 The Public Libraries (Ireland) Act 1902 (2 Edw 7 c 20)
 The Public Libraries (Scotland) Act 1920 (10 & 11 Geo 5 c 45)
 The Public Libraries and Museums Act 1964

Collective titles 

 The Public Libraries Acts 1892 and 1893 was the collective title of the Public Libraries Act 1892 (55 & 56 Vict c 53) and the Public Libraries Amendment Act 1893 (56 Vict c 11).
 The Public Libraries (Scotland) Acts 1887 and 1894 was the collective title of the Public Libraries Consolidation (Scotland) Act 1887 (50 & 51 Vict c 42) and the Public Libraries (Scotland) Act 1894 (57 & 58 Vict c 20).
 The Public Libraries (Ireland) Acts 1855 to 1894 was the collective title of the acts of those years, relating to Ireland.

See also
 Museums Act 1845
 List of short titles

References

Lists of legislation by short title